A number of Chinese characters are simplified-traditional multipairings, which do not have a one-to-one mapping between their simplified and traditional forms.

This is usually because the simplification process merged two or more distinct characters into one. In most cases, these traditional characters are homonyms, having the same pronunciation but different meanings. As a result, converting text from simplified to traditional characters is difficult to automate, especially in the case of common characters such as ⇄ (behind, empress), ⇄ (table, clock), ⇄ (traitor, rape) and more.

In a smaller number of cases, a single traditional character is mapped to multiple simplified characters as the character is only simplified in one of its usages.

The following is an exhaustive list of all characters whose simplified and traditional forms do not map in a one-to-one manner.

1 to 2

1 to 3

1 to 4

2 to 1

Special cases
 , : 
 , :  zhǐ (a musical note) and  zhēng (journey, campaign) are the same in both simplified and traditional.
 , :

References 

現代漢語常用簡繁一對多字義辨析表 (Identification chart for common Simplified Chinese characters with multiple Traditional equivalents) - 韻典網 ytenx.org

External links
 Simplified to Traditional Chinese Conversion Table

Chinese language
Homonymy in Chinese
Simplified Chinese characters